Michael Cox may refer to:

Political figures
 Michael Cox (New Zealand politician) (born 1939), New Zealand politician
 Mike Cox (American politician) (born 1961), American politician from Michigan

Religious figures
 Michael Cox (archbishop of Cashel) (1689–1779), Irish Anglican bishop
 Michael Cox (independent bishop) (born 1945), Irish independent bishop
 Sir Michael Cox, 3rd Baronet (died 1772), Irish baronet and clergyman

Sportsmen
 Michael Cox (cricketer) (born 1957), Australian cricketer
 Mike Cox (fullback) (born 1985), American gridiron football player
 Michael Cox (running back) (born 1989), American gridiron football player
 Michael Cox (soccer) (born 1992), Canadian soccer player
 Mike Cox (coach) (born 1965), American gridiron football coach

Other people
 Michael Cox (academic) (born 1947), professor of international relations at the London School of Economics
 Michael Cox (journalist), English journalist and author
 Michael Cox (novelist) (1948–2009), author of The Meaning of Night
 Michael Cox (police officer) (born 1965), American police officer, commissioner of the Boston Police Department
 Michael Cox (singer) (born 1940), British-born pop singer and actor
 Michael Graham Cox (1938–1995), British actor
 Mikey Cox (born 1977), former drummer for the band Coal Chamber
 W. Michael Cox (born 1950), American economist, speaker, and consultant

See also
 Michael Cocks (1929–2001), British Labour politician
 Mick Cocks (1955–2009), Australian musician